William John Jones, known as Shoni Jones was a Welsh professional footballer who appeared in the English Football League for Aberdare Athletic and Ton Pentre.

Family
Jones was one of five brothers who all played professional football, the others being Emlyn, Ivor, Bryn and Bert. His nephews Bryn, Cliff and Ken were also players.

References

Year of birth missing
Year of death missing
Welsh footballers
Aberdare Athletic F.C. players
Ton Pentre F.C. players
English Football League players
Association footballers not categorized by position